Filian may refer to:
 Filian-e Qaem Maqam
 Filian-e Sofla